Katherine "Kate" Ryder is an American entrepreneur and advocate for improving women's and family healthcare. She is the founder and CEO of digital health company Maven Clinic.

Early life and education
Ryder was born in Minnesota. She attended the University of Michigan as part of the LSA Honors program, where she double majored in English and Political Science. She obtained a bachelor's degree. After graduating, Ryder moved to Spain to teach English in the public school system.  She later attended the London School of Economics and earned a master's degree in anthropology.

Career
Ryder later wrote for The Economist from Southeast Asia, New York and London, and also for The New Yorker and The Wall Street Journal. In 2009, she also helped former U.S. Treasury Secretary Hank Paulson write his memoirs, On The Brink. She moved to London from Singapore in 2011.

In 2012, Ryder left the field of journalism and joined Index Ventures, a venture capital firm. For two years, she worked with venture capital across Europe and the US, and focused early-stage investments, including digital health. Seeing her friends struggle with building a family and child rearing while balancing careers gave her the idea of a startup to improve healthcare for women and families.

In 2014, Ryder founded Maven Clinic, a digital company offering support for fertility and family planning, pregnancy and postpartum, adoption, surrogacy, and parenting.

In January 2017, Ryder was named to Fast Company's list of Most Creative People in Business, in the Science and Health category.

In April 2018, Ryder was featured in TIME Magazine's The Boss series of profiles, where she described her inspiration for founding Maven Clinic.

In September 2019, Ryder was named to business magazine Inc's Female Founder's 100 list.

In February 2020, she helped close a $45 million Series C funding round for the company, and announced Reese Witherspoon, Mindy Kaling, Natalie Portman and 23andMe CEO Anne Wojcicki as investors in Maven. Also in 2020, business magazine Fortune selected Ryder to its list of 40 under 40 for Healthcare, and Crain's New York Business named her to its Notable in Healthcare 2020 list.

In August 2021, Maven Clinic announced a $110 million Series D funding round which included participation from Oprah Winfrey, making the company the first unicorn in women's and family health. In November, Ryder was recognized by healthcare industry news website Fierce Healthcare as one of its 2021 Women of Influence.

Advocacy
Ryder is an advocate for improving the health and well-being of women and families, in the areas of caregiving and family leave. She was a founding supporter of the Marshall Plan for Moms, to guide economic recovery after the COVID-19 pandemic by focusing on working mothers.  The group's efforts led to the introduction of related legislature in the United States House and Senate.

Personal life
Ryder is married and lives in Brooklyn, NY with her husband and children.

See also

References

External links
 Kate Ryder LinkedIn profile

American women business executives
University of Michigan alumni
Alumni of the London School of Economics
Year of birth missing (living people)
Living people